The National Council of Educational Research and Training (NCERT) is an apex resource organisation set up by the Government of India to assist and advise the central and state governments on academic matters related to school education.
The model textbooks published by the Council for adoption by school systems across India have generated controversies over the years. They have been accused of reflecting the political views of the party in power in the Government of India.

Background
The National Council of Educational Research and Training (NCERT) was established in 1961 by the Government of India by combining a number of existing organisations. It is an autonomous body in principle. However, it is Government-funded and its Director is appointed by the Ministry of Human Resource Development (formerly Ministry of Education). In practice, the NCERT has operated as a semi-official organisation promoting a "State-sponsored" educational philosophy.

In the early 1960s, national integration and unifying the various communities of India became a major concern to the Government. Education was seen as an important vehicle for the emotional integration of the nation. The Minister of Education M. C. Chagla was concerned that the textbooks in history should not recite myths but be secular and rational explanations of the past. A committee on history education was established with the membership of Tara Chand, Nilakanta Sastri, Mohammad Habib, Bisheshwar Prasad, B. P. Saxena and P. C. Gupta, which commissioned a number of history textbooks to be authored by the leading historians. Romila Thapar's Ancient India for class VI was published in 1966, Medieval India for class VII in 1967. A number of other books, Ram Sharan Sharma's Ancient India, Satish Chandra's Medieval India, Bipan Chandra's Modern India and Arjun Dev's India and the World were published in 1970's.

These texts were intended to be "model" textbooks which were "modern and secular," free of communal bias and prejudice. However, Deepa Nair states that they also carried a "Marxist imprint." The Marxist emphasis on social and economic issues implied a critique of culture and tradition. The value of spirituality was reduced. The Prime Minister Jawaharlal Nehru was sympathetic to the Marxist view of history and believed in a scientific outlook on civil society. In contrast, the Hindu nationalist historiography disagreed with Marxist historiography and based Indian history in the antiquity with glories of Hindu civilization and culture. These contrary views of history set the scene for conflict.

The textbooks faced political pressures from the inception. In 1969, a Parliamentary Consultative Committee wanted the textbook on Ancient India to state categorically that the "Aryans" were indigenous to India. But the demand was rejected by the Editorial Board as well as Thapar as the author. Further critical reactions came from Hindu and Sikh religious organisations that their respective religions and religious leaders had not been glorified. The Hindu Mahasabha and Arya Samaj claimed that the mention of beef-eating in ancient times went counter to the religious sentiments of the "Hindu nationality."

Such controversies continue till today. The controversy centers around the charges of an attempted "saffronised" rewriting of Indian history (i.e., making lessons consonant with the Hindutva). Allegations of historical revisionism with a Hindu nationalist agenda arose several times: under the Janata Party government 1977 to 1980 and again under the Bharatiya Janata Party government from 1998 to 2004 and from 2014 to 2019. In 2012, the organization has been blamed for attempting to insult the government by publishing 'offensive' cartoons in its textbooks.

Controversy during the Janata Party government (1977-1979)
Three months into the Janata Party government headed by Morarji Desai, the Prime Minister was handed an anonymous memorandum by Nanaji Deshmukh, former Jana Sangh leader and general secretary of the Janata Party, which targeted the NCERT textbooks. The books criticised were Thapar's Medieval India and Bipan Chandra's Modern India, along with two other books, Freedom Struggle by Tripathi, De and Chandra, and Communalism and the Writing of Indian History by Thapar, Mukhia and Chandra. (Only the first two were NCERT textbooks.) The Prime Minister forwarded the memorandum to the Education Minister suggesting that the books be withdrawn from circulation. In August 1977, R. S. Sharma's Ancient India was published, which was also targeted. The books were said to be "anti-Indian and anti-national" in content and "prejudicial to the study of history." The main issues seemed to be that they were not sufficiently critical of certain Muslim invaders during the medieval period and that they emphasized the role of leaders like Tilak and Aurobindo in the development of Hindu-Muslim antagonisms. The Hindu nationalist Rashtriya Swayamsevak Sangh launched a separate campaign against the books in its magazine Organiser.

The memorandum got leaked and a public debate ensued, which ran till 1979. The authors of the books argued for the legitimacy of independent interpretations as long as they were based on reliable evidence. The most hotly contested issue in the 1977 to 1979 controversy was the depiction of Mughal era (Muslim ruled) India and the role of Islam in India. Romila Thapar's Medieval India was criticised for being too sympathetic to Muslim viewpoints and for showing too little enthusiasm for Hindu revivalism. In November 1977, a committee of reputable historians was asked to examine the textbooks, which supported their continuance. Nonetheless, the government passed an act in July 1978, withdrawing R. S. Sharma's Ancient India from the syllabus of the Central Board of Secondary Education.

Changes in content (2002-2004)
In 2002, under the NDA government spearheaded by the Bharatiya Janata Party (BJP) the government made an attempt at changing the NCERT school textbooks through a new National Curriculum Framework. Marxist historians raised objections to the new curriculum, claiming "saffronisation" of education by allegedly raising the profile of Hindu cultural norms, views and historical personalities in school textbooks. The BJP opined that their only goal was to overhaul the stagnant and saturated institutions like NCERT and free them from the alleged dynastic control and hegemony of the Indian National Congress and the Communists. Party members also opined that their goal was not to promote sectarianism, but present a more accurate picture of Indian history and Indian culture (such as Vedic science), which was being downplayed by the left wing ideologues. NCERT also attracted plagiarism accusations in 2003 mainly from the Frontline Magazine published by the Hindu. "Contemporary World History", a textbook for Class XII, has been found to contain several sections lifted from World Civilizations - Their History and Their Culture authored by Edward MacNall Burns, Philip Lee Ralph, Robert E. Lerner and Standish Meacham. The latter book, published by American publishers W.W. Norton & Company Inc, has a special Indian edition, which is the only authorised, complete and unabridged reprint of the latest American edition.

The NDA was defeated in the elections of 2004 and the new UPA government pledged to "de-saffronise" textbooks and curricula nationwide and restore the secular character of education. In March, the UPA Government released new NCERT textbooks, based on the texts used before the controversial 2002 updates. The Ministry of Human Resource Development, which oversaw this project, stated that it had made only minor modifications to the books that predated the "saffronised" era. In Delhi, the Directorate of Education, in collaboration with the State Council of Educational Research and Training, prepared 47 new textbooks, and other state governments were expected to do likewise. In June 2004, a panel, composed of J. S. Grewal, Barun De and S. Settar, was constituted by the NCERT to review the new textbooks. This panel suggested that the textbooks that were being used in school syllabuses had poor content, were presented shoddily, and contained significant amounts of irrelevant information. The panel recommended, to the Human Resource Development (HRD) minister, that the new books not be used until the defects could be resolved. This led the Delhi students to use textbooks that were used in school syllabuses from the pre-"saffronised" period.

Press reports indicated that the rush to "de-saffronise" school texts resulted in Urdu versions not being ready for the academic year, which began in April. The reports asserted that this failure hurt Urdu-speaking students by depriving them of needed textbooks. The NCERT denied the claims.

Controversies during UPA government (2004-2014) 
The UPA and previous Congress-led governments have been accused by the BJP of revising history to present a Marxist bias, and whitewashing the record of Muslim atrocities to acquire Muslim votes.

Amendments were made in history textbook for Class XII in lessons on Sikhism after protest from Sikh organisations in 2006. In 2012, there were protests for removal of controversial anti-Hindi agitation and a Ambedkar cartoon.

Cartoons (2012)
In April 2012, The Republican Party of India (RPI) Athavale group demanded a ban on an eleventh grade text book by the NCERT saying a drawn cartoon in the book insulted Dr. Babasaheb Ambedkar. The originally published book in 2006 wasn't recognized as part of the syllabus until 2012. On 2 April, Ramdas Athavale held a press conference and burnt copies of the page from the textbook prescribed in the political-civic science syllabus. Athavale demanded the resignation of Union Minister for Human Resource Development Kapil Sibal who also was the president of the NCERT board. RPI workers burnt his effigy. The cartoon figures on page 18 of chapter one titled "Constitution, why and how" in the book called Indian Constitution at Work. It shows Ambedkar sitting on a snail which is labelled ‘Constitution' cracking a whip. Behind him is Pandit Nehru, also shown with a whip. The caption says: "Cartoonist's impression of the ‘snail's pace' with which the Constitution was made. Athavale said the cartoon insulted the architect of India's Constitution and the people responsible must be dealt with. The NCERT too had insulted him, he pointed out. The issue created uproar in both Houses of Parliament. NCERT chief advisors Yogendra Yadav and Suhas Palshikar resigned on Friday after the government issued an apology and promised to remove the cartoon. Speaking to reporters, Palshikar said it seemed like the government didn't have an option and therefore decided to agree with the protesting MPs. "The caricature was a symbol of the progressive outlook in education. This has now been undone. We are of the opinion that as advisors we can have a different opinion. Hence, we don't think it's appropriate for us to be in this position anymore." Suhas Palshikar is a professor in the Department of Politics and Public Administration at the University of Pune.

Soon after that controversy had been solved, the Shahi Imam of Fatehpuri Mosque, Mohd. Mukarram Ahmed wrote to Kapil Sibal asking to remove a medieval painting of Gabriel the Archangel and another of pilgrims at the Kaaba from the chapter 'The Central Islamic Lands' on the ground that they were against the law of Sharia law. The letter, dated 10 September 2012 has also been sent to Delhi Chief Minister Sheila Dikshit, education minister Kiran Walia and NCERT chief Parvin Sinclair. "Jibreell (Gabriel) is the chief angel who brought messages to the Islamic prophet. The painting in the book is comical in its presentation of the Archangel. Secondly, the caption for the illustration on pilgrims at the Kaba states that they are 'touching' the stone even though it's customary to kiss it. But the Jibril painting is the most objectionable and will not be tolerated," said Ahmed in his letter. However, rejecting this, Najaf Haider, an associate professor at the Centre for Historical Studies at the Jawaharlal Nehru University said "The Gabriel painting was sourced from a 13th century text called Ajaib-ul-Makhluqat, written by a renowned scholar, Qazwini. The second illustration was taken from a 15th century collection of fragmented pieces. The letter only states the paintings are against Sharia and doesn't exactly point out what's objectionable about them. Moreover, these texts (from where the paintings are sourced) were written in Muslim courts by people who were far more scholarly and pious than anyone can claim to be today."

Changes in content during the BJP government (2014–present)

The poem Sabse Khatarnak by the Hindi poet Pash was included in the NCERT textbook for 11th standard Hindi students in 2006. In 2017, the BJP government tried to remove it, but in vain.

The NCERT made two controversial changes to the class XII political science textbook ‘Politics in India Since Independence’ in 2017. It changed a heading of a passage describing the 2002 Gujarat riots from ‘Anti-Muslim riots in Gujarat’ to just ‘Gujarat riots’. In another class XII textbook titled ‘Contemporary World Politics’ the Aksai Chin region was shown to be a disputed area and coloured in the same colour as China. According to the NCERT, the controversial map was not a map of India, but a map of East and South East Asia published by University of Texas at Austin. The map was replaced after a few months following media scrutiny.

Before the commencement of the 2019–20 academic year, NCERT's decided to cut significant chapters from its Class IX history textbook: on clothing and caste conflicts; the history of cricket; and the impact of colonial capitalism on peasants and farmers. Similarly from the Class X History textbook, chapters on 'The Nationalist Movement in Indo-China', 'Work, Life and Leisure - Cities in the Contemporary World', and ‘Novels, Society and History’ had been deleted. NCERT's director Hrushikesh Senapaty highlighted that students must have time to engage outdoor. The syllabus of Social Sciences, which covers History, Geography, Political Science, and Economics, had 24 chapters in Class IX as compared to 15 each in Science and Mathematics. Similarly, Class X Social Sciences had 28 chapters as compared to 16 each in Science and Mathematics. This exercise brought down the total number of chapters in Social Sciences in Class IX and X to 20 and 25 respectively.

On 7th November 2020, an RTI was filed asking NCERT to provide a source to back its claim that temples were reconstructed under the reign of Aurangzeb.

See also
 Bias in curricula
 Saffronisation
 California textbook controversy over Hindu history

Notes and references

Sources

Further reading

External links
NCERT Website

Textbook controversies
Hindu education
Education controversies in India
Hinduism-related controversies